Silvermere Lake may refer to

 Silvermere Lake (Canada)
 Silvermere Lake (England)